
Gmina Dobrzeń Wielki, German Gemeinde Groß Döbern is a rural gmina (administrative district) in Opole County, Opole Voivodeship, in south-western Poland.

Since 2009 the commune, like much of the surrounding area, has been a bilingual commune in German and Polish.

The gmina contains part of the protected area called Stobrawa Landscape Park.

Villages
Gmina Dobrzeń Wielki contains the villages and settlements of: Dobrzeń Wielki, Borki, Brzezie, Chróścice, Czarnowąsy, Dobrzeń Mały, Krzanowice, Kup, Świerkle.

Neighbouring gminas
Gmina Dobrzeń Wielki is bordered by the city of Opole and by the gminas of Dąbrowa, Łubniany, Murów, Pokój and Popielów.

Twin towns – sister cities

Gmina Dobrzeń Wielki is twinned with two other towns, these being:
 Heuchelheim, Germany
 Wil, Switzerland

References

Dobrzen Wielki
Opole County
Bilingual communes in Poland